Botanical gardens in Poland have collections consisting entirely of Poland native and endemic species; most have a collection that include plants from around the world. There are botanical gardens and arboreta in all states and territories of Poland, most are administered by local governments, some are privately owned.
 Ogród Botaniczny w Bydgoszczy, Bydgoszcz
 Ogród Botaniczny w Oliwie, Gdańsk
 Ogród Botaniczny w Krakowie, Kraków
 Ogród Botaniczny w Łodzi, Łódź
 Ogród Botaniczny w Lublinie, Lublin
 Ogród Botaniczny UW w Warszawie, Warsaw
 Ogród Botaniczny PAN w Warszawie, Warsaw
 Ogród Botaniczny we Wrocławiu, Wrocław
 Ogród Botaniczny w Zakopanem, Zakopane
 Ogród Botaniczny w Poznaniu, Poznań
 Ogród Botaniczny w Gołubiu, Kashubia
 Ogród Botaniczny w Zielonej Górze, Zielona Góra

References 

Poland
Botanical gardens